Lys-63-specific deubiquitinase BRCC36 is an enzyme that in humans is encoded by the BRCC3 gene.

Function 

This gene encodes a subunit of the BRCA1-BRCA2-containing complex (BRCC), which is an E3 ubiquitin ligase. This protein is also thought to be involved in the cellular response to ionizing radiation and progression through the G2/M checkpoint. Alternative splicing results in multiple transcript variants.

Repair of DNA damage

BRCC36, the protein product of the BRCC3 gene, is a deubiquitinating enzyme and a core component of the deubiquitin complex BRCA1-A.  BRCA1, as distinct from BRCA1-A,  is employed in the repair of chromosomal damage with an important role in the error-free homologous recombinational (HR) repair of DNA double-strand breaks.  Sequestration of BRCA1 away from the DNA damage site suppresses homologous recombination and redirects the cell in the direction of repair by the process of non-homologous end joining (NHEJ).  The role of BRCA1-A appears to be to bind BRCA1 with high affinity and withdraw it away from the site of DNA damage to the periphery where it remains sequestered, thus promoting DNA repair by NHEJ in preference to HR.

Interactions 

BRCC3 has been shown to interact with BRE, BRCA2, RAD51, BRCA1, P53 and BARD1.

References

External links

Further reading